The 2020–21 season was Detroit City FC's second professional season since the club was established in 2012 and their first full season in the National Independent Soccer Association.

Overview
After the cancellation of the 2020 NISA Spring season the association confirmed that the 2020–21 season would take place as normal, under local guidelines for social distancing and restrictions for fan attendance.

Club

Roster 
As of May 21, 2021.

Coaching staff

Equipment 
The club wore different kits for the 2020 and 2021 portions of the season. Adidas was the supplier and Metro-Detroit Chevy Dealers was the sponsor through both halves of the season.

Transfers

In

Out

Friendlies

Competitions

2020 NISA Independent Cup 
The NISA Independent Cup was originally unveiled on April 27, 2020, following the 2020 Spring Season's cancellation, as a competition between NISA members and high level amateur clubs. On July 1, the regional tournament was officially announced as a 'pre-season event' with Detroit City taking part alongside three other association members.

Competing within the Great Lakes Region, The team was reunited with Rust Belt Derby rival FC Buffalo and Cleveland SC, against whom Detroit City had lost the 2019 NPSL Midwest Region Finals to in PKs.

Standings

Matches

2020 NISA Fall Season 

The schedule for the 2020 NISA Fall Season was released on 31 July 2020. The format consisted of a regionalized East/West divisional competition beginning 8 August, with Detroit playing in the Eastern Conference, and a single-location tournament to be held 21 September through 2 October, resulting in a single Fall champion.

Results summary

Matches

Fall Playoffs
Detroit City FC hosted the entirety of the 2020-21 NISA Fall Playoffs at Keyworth Stadium.

Group stage

Knock-Out Stage

Spring Season

The Spring season began on April 13, 2021, with a bubble tournament named Legends Cup and hosted by Chattanooga FC, with the winner gaining entry into the Spring 2021 Final. Phase 2, which is scheduled to begin on May 1, 2021, will be a traditional regular season hosted in each team's markets, the winner of which will face the winner of Phase 1 in the Spring 2021 Final, to determine the Spring champion.

Detroit City was assigned to the second group of three of three. The best team at the end of the group stage qualifies directly to the Legends Cup final, while the second and third seeds will play a semifinal game to determine the second finalist.

Group 2

Legends Cup Standings

Phase 2

Squad statistics

Appearances and goals 

|-
! colspan="18" style="background:#dcdcdc; text-align:center"| Goalkeepers

|-
! colspan="18" style="background:#dcdcdc; text-align:center"| Defenders

|-
! colspan="18" style="background:#dcdcdc; text-align:center"| Midfielders

|-
! colspan="18" style="background:#dcdcdc; text-align:center"| Forwards

|-
! colspan="18" style="background:#dcdcdc; text-align:center"| Left during season

|-
|}

Goal scorers

Disciplinary record

References

Detroit City FC
Detroit City FC
Detroit City FC
Detroit City FC